, nicknamed "Hide", is a Japanese musician and songwriter. He is known as the rhythm guitarist for the rock band Buck-Tick since 1983.

Life and career

Buck-Tick
In 1985, when Hide and Yutaka Higuchi graduated from high school they moved to Tokyo together, where Hide started culinary school. Throughout Buck-Tick's long career, he has the second most songwriting credits.

Hoshino married in 2006.

He has released only one solo song; "Jarring Voice" on the compilation Dance 2 Noise 001. He has also performed on Issay's Flowers, Fake?'s Marilyn is a Bubble and Chiaki Kuriyama's Circus.

On September 19, 2012, Hoshino released the book Simply Life. It compiles the interviews he gave to the magazine Ongaku to Hito every year since 2001 with a new long interview. It was republished in 2022 as Simply Life ~Life Goes On~.

Dropz
Dropz (stylized as dropz) is a side project of Hidehiko Hoshino that began in 2006. The members consist of himself (guitars, programming & keyboards), Kelli Dayton (vocals) and Cube Juice (programming & electronics). He wrote the music, while Kelli wrote the lyrics. They released their first album, Sweet Oblivion, on April 4, 2007, and a limited edition remix of the same album.

Discography
With Buck-Tick

With Dropz
 Sweet Oblivion (April 4, 2007) Oricon peak position: #71

References

Further reading
 Simply Life, by Hidehiko Hoshino, Ongaku to Hito, 2012, 

1966 births
Living people
Buck-Tick members
Visual kei musicians
Japanese rock guitarists
Musicians from Gunma Prefecture
Japanese songwriters
20th-century Japanese guitarists
21st-century Japanese guitarists